The 1981 Masters (also known as the 1981 Volvo Masters for sponsorship reasons) was a men's tennis tournament held in Madison Square Garden, New York City, United States from January 13 through January 17, 1982.  It was the year-end championship of the 1981 Volvo Grand Prix tour.

Finals

Singles

 Ivan Lendl defeated  Vitas Gerulaitis, 6–7(5–7), 2–6, 7–6(8–6), 6–2, 6–4.

Doubles

 Peter Fleming and  John McEnroe defeated  Kevin Curren and  Steve Denton 6–3, 6–3.

References

 
Volvo Masters
Grand Prix tennis circuit year-end championships
Tennis tournaments in the United States
Volvo Masters
Volvo Masters
Volvo Masters